The 3rd Annual Maya Awards (Indonesian: Piala Maya 2014) is an award ceremony honoring the best in Indonesian films of 2014. The ceremony was held in Museum Nasional, Central Jakarta, on December 20, 2014.

Awards
The number of awards being given this year increase from the previous year to 32 competitive categories with 4 special awards. The following new categories were not present previously:

 Best Short Documentary (previously Best Documentary)
 Best Long Documentary (previously Best Documentary)
 Best Animated Film (previously Best Short Animated Film)

Winners and nominees
Winners are listed first and signified in bold letters.

Technical

Performers

Competition

Special awards

Multiple wins and nominations
The following films received multiple awards:

The following films receive multiple nominations:

References

Maya Awards (Indonesia)
2014 film awards